Wonderful World is a 2010 Japanese fantasy drama film directed by Daisuke Namikawa. It features Japanese voice actors who worked on anime copyrights.

Cast
Seishi Katayama – Mamoru Miyano
Narumi Fukushima – Ayumi Uehara
Koichi Katayama – Daisuke Namikawa
Akiko Tanaka – Yuka Hirata
Ryoji Nakamura – Showtaro Morikubo
Chin'nen – Tomokazu Sugita
Shaki Mikami – Yuko Kaida
Jiro Kumada  – Tsuyoshi Koyama
Daejeon Shunsuke – Yumehito Moroboshi (Ayabie)
Residents of heme MR0 – Tomokazu Seki
Minami Satoko – Miki Nagasawa
Maya Tenmura –Mitsuki Saiga
Kozo Tajima – Anri Katsu
Nagaoka Clinic Nurse – Fuyuka Oura
Contact Lunch Vendor – Yurie Kobori
Tatsuoki – Mafia Kajita
Atsushi Ito – Rikiya Koyama
Yoshidaka Nishikawa – Keiji Fujiwara
Kizaki Junichiro – Kouichi Yamadera
Ryūtoki Genninji and Yumezo Kijima – Kenji Utsumi (2 roles)

References

External links

2010 directorial debut films
2010 films
Japanese fantasy drama films
2010s fantasy drama films
2010 drama films
2010s Japanese films